Edoardo Di Bella (born 4 May 2001) is an Italian footballer who plays as a defender for Tritium.

Club career
On 11 July 2019, he joined Eccellenza club Casatese.

Career statistics

Notes

References

2001 births
Living people
Italian footballers
Association football defenders
Calcio Lecco 1912 players
Tritium Calcio 1908 players
Serie D players